John Henry Sharrott  (August 13, 1869 – December 31, 1927) was a Major League Baseball player. He played in the Majors from 1890 to 1893 and in the minors from 1894 to 1903. He also managed in the minors from 1904 to 1906 in the New York State League and coached at Worcester Polytechnic Institute.

Sources

Major League Baseball pitchers
Major League Baseball outfielders
New York Giants (NL) players
Philadelphia Phillies players
Baseball players from New York (state)
1869 births
1927 deaths
Bangor Millionaires players
Wilkes-Barre Coal Barons players
Brockton Shoemakers players
Detroit Tigers (Western League) players
Worcester Farmers players
Indianapolis Hoosiers (minor league) players
Worcester Quakers players
Worcester Hustlers players
Montreal Royals players
Worcester Riddlers players
Minor league baseball managers
19th-century baseball players
Somerville West Ends players
Westfield Athletics players